Ascorbyl stearate (C24H42O7) is an ester formed from ascorbic acid and stearic acid.  In addition to its use as a source of vitamin C, it is used as an antioxidant food additive in margarine (E number E305). The USDA limits its use to 0.02% individually or in conjunction with other antioxidants.

See also
Ascorbyl palmitate
Mineral ascorbates

References

Food antioxidants
Fatty acid esters
Stearate esters
Vitamin C